Chloé Vande Velde (born 6 June 1997) is a Belgian footballer who plays as a forward for ADO Den Haag in the Dutch Eredevisie and has appeared for the Belgium women's national team.

Career
Vande Velde has been capped for the Belgium national team, appearing for the team during the 2019 FIFA Women's World Cup qualifying cycle.

International goals
Scores and results list the Belgian goal tally first.

References

External links
 
 
 
 

1997 births
Living people
Belgian women's footballers
Belgium women's international footballers
Women's association football forwards
K.A.A. Gent (women) players
Belgium women's youth international footballers